Beaver Kill Range is a mountain located in the Catskill Mountains of New York west-northwest of Frost Valley. Wildcat Mountain is located east-southeast, Cradle Rock Ridge is located north, and Mongaup Mountain is located west-southwest of Beaver Kill Range.

References

Mountains of Ulster County, New York
Mountains of New York (state)